Harry L. Armstrong (October 15, 1915 – April 28, 2011) was a member of the Ohio Senate.  He served the 17th District, which encompassed much of Southeastern, Appalachian, Ohio.  He was responsible for many pieces of legislation that benefited Ohio State Parks and the coal industry.  He served from 1967, when districts were created, until 1974.

He died on April 28, 2011.

References

1915 births
Republican Party Ohio state senators
2011 deaths
People from Hocking County, Ohio